Severny is a rural locality (a settlement) and the administrative center of Severny Selsoviet, Pervomaysky District, Altai Krai, Russia. The population was 1,306 as of 2013. There are 28 streets.

Geography 
Severny is located 69 km north of Novoaltaysk (the district's administrative centre) by road. Novokrayushkino is the nearest rural locality.

References 

Rural localities in Pervomaysky District, Altai Krai